Rodenbach is a municipality in the Main-Kinzig district, in Hesse, Germany. It is situated on the river Kinzig, 8 km east of Hanau.

References

External links

  

Municipalities in Hesse
Main-Kinzig-Kreis